Barauli Assembly constituency is one of the 403 constituencies of the Uttar Pradesh Legislative Assembly, India. It is a part of the Aligarh district and one of the five assembly constituencies in the Aligarh Lok Sabha constituency. First election in this assembly constituency was held in 1974 after the delimitation order was passed in 1967. After the "Delimitation of Parliamentary and Assembly Constituencies Order" was passed in 2008, the constituency was assigned identification number 72.

Wards / Areas
Extent of Barauli Assembly constituency is KCs Barauli, Gabhana, PCs Kinhua, Darau Chandpur, Amritpur Bakhtpur & Bhojpur Gaiyanpur of Chandaus KC of Gabhana Tehsil ; PCs Harduaganj, Ukhlana, Baraotha, Sapera Bhanpur, Talibnagar, Devsaini, Mahrawal, Ramgarh Panjupur, Godha, Jawan Sikanderpur, Baharampur, Maimri, Kanora, Chhalesar, Satha, Nagaula, Barheti, Rathgawan, Kastli Basya of Morthal KC, PCs Baranadi, Chhidawali, Azamabad Machhua, Kalai of Jalali KC, Harduaganj NP & Qasimpur (CT) of Koil Tehsil .

Members of the Legislative Assembly

Election results

2022

2012

See also

Aligarh Lok Sabha constituency
Aligarh district
Sixteenth Legislative Assembly of Uttar Pradesh
Uttar Pradesh Legislative Assembly

References

External links
 

Politics of Aligarh district
Assembly constituencies of Uttar Pradesh
Constituencies established in 1974